is the capital city of Shizuoka Prefecture, Japan, and the prefecture's second-largest city in both population and area.

Overview
The city's name is made up of two kanji, 静 shizu, meaning "still" or "calm"; and 岡 oka, meaning "hill(s)". In 1869, Shizuoka Domain was first created out of the older Sunpu Domain, and that name was retained when the city was incorporated in 1885. In 2003, Shizuoka absorbed neighboring Shimizu City (now Shimizu Ward) to create the new and expanded city of Shizuoka, briefly becoming the largest city by land area in Japan. In 2005, it became one of Japan's "designated cities".

Cityscapes

Geography
Shizuoka City lies in central Shizuoka Prefecture, about halfway between Tokyo and Nagoya along the Tōkaidō Corridor, between Suruga Bay to the south and the Minami Alps in the north. Shizuoka had the largest area of any municipality in Japan after merging with Shimizu City in April 2003, until February 2005, when Takayama in Gifu Prefecture superseded it by merging with nine surrounding municipalities.

Shizuoka is the 5th largest city in Japan in terms of geographic area after Takayama, Hamamatsu, Nikkō, and Kitami. It is also the 2nd largest city in Shizuoka Prefecture in terms of both geographic area and population after Hamamatsu, but ranks higher as an Urban Employment Area, and leads as a metropolitan area and business region.

The fan-like shape of the Shizuoka Plain and Miho Peninsula were formed over the ages by the fast-flowing Abe River, carrying along collapsed sand and earth. These areas form the foundations of the city today. The isolated Mount Kunō separates the Suruga coastline from the Shimizu coastline.

Basic data 
 Area of densely populated region

 Urban planning area

 Area zoned for urbanization

Nature

Mountains

Rivers
 (upstream)

Lakes
 (Ikawa Dam)
 (Hatanagi-I Dam)

Climate
On the south-central Pacific coast Shizuoka has a humid subtropical climate (Köppen climate classification Cfa), which is hot and humid in the summer, and rarely snows in the winter. It is close to the warm Kuroshio Current and is wet even by Japanese standards with only slightly less precipitation than Kanazawa on the opposite side of Honshū, but it is paradoxically the sunniest of Japan's major cities owing to the absence of summer fog and its sheltered location from the northwesterly winds off the Sea of Japan. Further north, the mountainous Ikawa area is part of the Japanese snow country, where there are ski areas.

Area

Wards

Administrative center, made up of the former Shizuoka north of the Tōkaidō Main Line excluding Osada district

Former Shizuoka south of the Tōkaidō Main Line and Osada district

Former city of Shimizu and towns of Kanbara and Yui.

Administrative district "image colours"
On 22 December 2006, colours and logos were established for each of the wards.

Demographics

Historic population
Per Japanese census data, the population of Shizuoka has been declining slowly since 1990.

Bordering municipalities

Shizuoka Prefecture
Fuji
Fujieda
Yaizu
Shimada
Fujinomiya
Kawanehon（Haibara District）

Yamanashi Prefecture
Minami-Alps
Hayakawa (Minamikoma District)
Minobu (Minamikoma District)
Nanbu (Minamikoma District)

Nagano Prefecture
Iida
Ina
Ōshika (Shimoina District)

History

Ancient history
The area that is now the city of Shizuoka has been inhabited since prehistoric times. Numerous kofun have been found within the city limits, and the Toro archaeological site indicates that a major Yayoi period (circa 400 BC–300 AD) settlement existed in what is now part of the central city area.

Suruga was established as a province of Japan in the early Nara period. At some point between the year 701 and 710, the provincial capital was relocated from what is now Numazu, to a more central location on the banks of the Abe River at a location named  (a contraction of ) or alternatively .

Pre-modern Shizuoka 
During the Muromachi period, Sunpu was the capital of the Imagawa clan. The Imagawa were defeated at the Battle of Okehazama, and Sunpu was subsequently ruled by Takeda Shingen, followed by Tokugawa Ieyasu. However, Toyotomi Hideyoshi relocated Ieyasu, and installed Nakamura Kazutada to rule Sunpu. After the Toyotomi were defeated in the Battle of Sekigahara, Ieyasu recovered Sunpu, reassigning it to his own retainer, Naitō Nobunari in 1601. This marked the start of Sunpu Domain.

In April 1606, Ieyasu officially retired from the post of shōgun, and retired to Sunpu, where he established a secondary court, from which he could influence Shōgun Tokugawa Hidetada from behind the scenes.

From the Meiji period to World War II
In 1869, after the fall of the Tokugawa shogunate, the former shogunal line, headed by Tokugawa Iesato was sent to Sunpu and assigned the short-lived Sunpu Domain. The same year, Sunpu was renamed "Shizuoka". Shizuoka Domain became Shizuoka Prefecture with the abolition of the han system in 1871, which was expanded in 1876 through merger with the former Hamamatsu Prefecture and western portions of Ashigaru Prefecture in 1876. Shizuoka Station on the Tōkaidō Main Line was opened on 1 February 1889. The same day, a fire burned down most of downtown Shizuoka.

The modern city was founded on 1 April 1889. At the time, the population was 37,681, and Shizuoka was one of the first 31 cities established in Japan.

An electric tram service began in 1911. In 1914, due to heavy rains caused by a typhoon, the Abe River flooded, inundating the downtown area. In the national census of 1920, the population of Shizuoka was 74,093. The area of the city continued to expand through the 1920s and 1930s through merger with outlying towns and villages. In 1935, the city was struck by a 6.4 magnitude earthquake, resulting in much damage. Although soon rebuilt, a large fire in 1940 again destroyed much of the center of the city.

During World War II, Shizuoka lacked targets of major military significance, and was initially only lightly bombed during several American air raids. However, in a major firebombing raid of 19 June 1945, the city suffered an extreme amount of damage with high civilian casualties.

Post-war Shizuoka
The area of the city continued to expand through the 1950s and 1960s through merger with outlying towns and villages. On 1 October 1964, the Tōkaidō Shinkansen began services to Shizuoka, and on 25 April 1969 the city was connected to the Tōmei Expressway. On 7 July 1974, the Abe River flooded, and landslides occurred during heavy rains, killing 23 people.
On 16 August 1980, a major gas leak in an underground shopping center near Shizuoka Station resulted in an explosion, killing 15 people and seriously injuring 233 others. The Shizuoka City Hall moved to new premises in 1986. On 1 April 1992, Shizuoka was designated a core city by the central government, giving it increased autonomy.

The 1 April 2003 merger with Shimizu City (current Shimizu Ward) greatly expanded the area and population of Shizuoka, which then became a designated city on 1 April 2005, and was divided into three wards. 

Despite being somewhat geographically isolated from the rest of the city, the town of Kanbara (from Ihara District) was merged into Shizuoka on 31 March 2006, becoming part of Shimizu-ku. On 1 November 2008, the town of Yui (also from Ihara District) was also merged into Shimizu-ku, resulting in the dissolution of Ihara District.

Government

Shizuoka has a mayor-council form of government with a directly elected mayor and a unicameral city legislature of 48 members. The city contributes 13 members to the Shizuoka Prefectural Assembly. In terms of national politics, the city is divided between Shizuoka 1st District and Shizuoka 4th District in the lower house of the Japanese Diet.

Mayors

Former Shizuoka city from 1889 to 2003

Former Shimizu city from 1924 to 2003

Since 2003 merger

Administration

Ward offices
Shizuoka City Office/Aoi Ward Office:5-1 Ōtemachi, Aoi-ku, Shizuoka-shi 420-8602
Aoi Ward Ikawa Branch Office:656-2 Ikawa, Aoi-ku, Shizuoka-shi 428-0504
Suruga Ward Office:10-40 Minamiyahata-chō, Suruga-ku, Shizuoka-shi 422-8550
Suruga Ward Osada Branch Office:13-1 Kami-Kawahara Suruga-ku, Shizuoka-shi 421-0132
Shimizu City Office/Shimizu Ward Office:6-9 Asahi-chō, Shimizu-ku, Shizuoka-shi 424-8701
Shimizu Ward Kanbara Branch Office:1-21-1 Kanbara Shinden, Shimizu-ku, Shizuoka-shi 421-3211

External relations

Twin towns – Sister cities
Shizuoka has twin and friendship relationships with several cities.

International
Sister cities

Friendship cities

National
Sister cities

Friendship cities

Economy 

Shizuoka has 35,579 businesses as of 2012.

Employment by industry: Agriculture 0.1%, Manufacturing: 26.9%, Service 73.0%

Greater Shizuoka, Shizuoka Metropolitan Employment Area, has a GDP of US$45.8 billion as of 2010.

Shizuoka's GDP per capita (PPP) 2014 was US$41,472.

Fuji Dream Airlines is headquartered in Aoi-ku, Shizuoka.

Agriculture
Green tea Varieties such as Motoyama and Yabukita are grown in all corners of the city, and the varieties grown especially in the Warashina area in Aoi Ward and the Ryōgōchi area of Shimizu Ward are known for their high quality
Strawberries  are strawberries that grow in holes on inclined stone walls, grown especially along an  stretch of Kunō Kaidō (route 150), also known as "Strawberry Road", along the coast of Suruga Bay.
Wasabi especially in areas such as Utōgi in Aoi Ward
Lotus roots especially in the Asahata area of Aoi Ward
Roses especially in the Ihara and Okitsu areas in Shimizu Ward
Peachesespecially in the Osada area:::
Potatoes
Especially the Sebago potato. Originally exported to Crookwell

Fishery
Shimizu Port boasts the largest haul of tuna in all Japan. Kanbara Harbour enjoys a prosperous haul of sakura ebi, and Mochimune Harbour enjoys a prosperous haul of shirasu sardines.

Products
Abekawa Mochi is a type of rice cake (or mochi) made with kinako soy flour that is a specialty of Shizuoka.

Shizuoka has a long history of being involved in the craft industries going back over 400 years ago, using trees, including  cypress. The model industry goes back to the late 1920s when wood was used to produce model toys, using sashimono woodworking joinery techniques, purely for educational purposes. Craftsmen later moved on to lighter woods including balsa, but following the war, with the importation of US built scale models, many companies either turned to plastic models to compete or went under.

The town has since become internationally notable for its plastic scale model kits and is resident to long-established companies such as Aoshima, Fujimi, Hasegawa, and Tamiya. Another model brand, Bandai, produces its Gundam models exclusively at its Bandai Hobby Center plant in the city. The city hosts the long-running Shizuoka Hobby Show annually in May at Twin Messe Shizuoka.

Media

Print media
The Shizuoka Shimbun is the area's primary newspaper.

The book trilogy “Paper Gods” by Amanda Sun takes place in this city.

Broadcast media

Television
 NHK Shizuoka (Analogue Channel 9; Digital Channel 1)
 NHK Shizuoka Educational Channel (Analogue Channel 2; Digital Channel 2)
 Shizuoka Broadcasting System (SBS) (Analogue Channel 11; Digital Channel 6)
 TV Shizuoka (Analogue Channel 35; Digital Channel 8)
 Shizuoka Daiichi Television (Analogue Channel 31; Digital Channel 4)
 Shizuoka Asahi Television (Analogue Channel 33; Digital Channel 5)

Cable television
Shizuoka Cable Television (Dream Wave Shizuoka)

Radio
 NHK1 882 kHz
 NHK2 639 kHz
 NHK-FM 88.8 MHz
 SBS 1404 kHz / 93.9 MHz
 K-MIX 79.2 MHz
 FM-Hi！76.9 MHz
 Marine Pal (FM Shimizu) 76.3 MHz
 Guzen Media Japan—A podcast and vidcast based in Shizuoka, Japan

Education

Colleges and universities 
Shizuoka University
National university, founded 1949. Main campus in Suruga Ward. Abbreviated to 静大 (Shizudai).
University of Shizuoka（Shizuoka Prefectural University）
Public university whose main campus is in Suruga Ward, close to Kusanagi Station.
Tokai University
Shimizu campus of the Tokyo-based private university
Tokoha Gakuen University
Private university founded in 1946
Shizuoka Eiwa Gakuin University
Co-educational private university in Suruga Ward, founded by missionaries from the Methodist Church of Canada with the support of the Shizuoka prefectural government. First institution in Shizuoka Prefecture to offer secondary education for girls, it became a four-year coeducational university in 2002.
University of Shizuoka Junior College
Junior college in Suruga Ward, affiliated with University of Shizuoka.
Tokai University Junior College
Junior college in Aoi Ward, affiliated with Tokai University.
Tokoha Gakuen Junior College
Junior college in Aoi Ward, affiliated with Tokoha Gakuen University.

Primary and secondary education
Shizuoka has 91 elementary schools, 57 middle schools and 27 high schools. In addition there are 29 vocations schools and 12 public libraries.

Transportation

Airways

Airports
The nearest airport is Shizuoka Airport, situated between Makinohara and Shimada.

Railways
Shizuoka lies on the Tōkaidō Main Line, the JR Central main railway line from Tokyo to Osaka, and is well-served by the Tōkaidō Shinkansen, limited express and regional trains. The central station of Shizuoka is in the city centre. Shizuoka also has an LRT line, the Shizuoka Railway, administered by the Shizuoka Railway Co., Ltd. at Shizuoka Station. The under construction Chūō Shinkansen will pass through the mountainous area in the northern tip of the city. However, the line is not planned to have a station in Shizuoka.

High-Speed Rail
Central Japan Railway Company（JR Tōkai）
Tōkaidō Shinkansen：-  -

Conventional lines
Central Japan Railway Company（JR Tōkai）
Tōkaidō Main Line：-  -
Shizuoka Railway（Shizutetsu）
Shizuoka Railway Shizuoka-Shimizu Line： –  –  –  –  –  –  –  –  –  –  –  –  –  – 
Ōigawa Railway（Daitetsu）
Ōigawa Railway Ikawa Line：-  –  -

Buses

Buse terminal
Shin-Shizuoka Cenova

Roads

Expressway
 Tōmei Expressway
 Shin-Tōmei Expressway
 Chūbu-Ōdan Expressway

Japan National Route

Seaways

Sea port
The Port of Shimizu-ku, in Shimizu City (now Shimizu Ward), is a long established mid-size sea port, catering to container ships, dry bulk ships and cruise ships.

It is well located, being in between the two major port areas of Japan, i.e. the Tokyo Bay ports of Tokyo, Kawasaki and Yokohama (Keihin ports) and the Osaka Bay ports of Osaka and Kobe (Hanshin ports).

In tonnage, imports (about ) are close to twice export volumes, but in trade value exports are twice as valuable as imports.

The Port of Shimizu container traffic is about balanced, with over 250,000 TEU in each direction, with auto parts and chemicals amongst the main cargo types. Major international container lines provide weekly services on major trade routes, including North America, Europe and Asia, with about 110 calls per months on 28 trade routes.

The port of Shimizu also includes a terminal to receive LNG tankers and store imported Liquefied natural gas; it is operated by Shimizu LNG, a subsidiary of Shizuoka Gas (Japan is the world's largest importer of LNG).

The Port of Shimizu is also connected to other Japan ports. In particular, it is served by a Roll-on/roll-off service serving the port of Ōita, on the north-east coast of the southern island of Kyushu. This service, which sails three times a week and has a transit time of 20 hours, has enabled a modal shift of freight trucks from road to sea, thereby contributing to decreasing congestion and pollution on roads.

Tourism

Local attractions

Museums
 Shizuoka Prefectural Museum of Art
 Shizuoka City Tokaido Hiroshige Museum of Art
 Museum of Natural and Environmental History, Shizuoka

Major attractions
 Nihondaira
 Miho no Matsubara

Historic spots

In Aoi Ward
Shizuoka Sengen Shrine
A collection of Shinto shrines that was patronised by powerful warrior clans since ancient times, most notably the Tokugawa clan.
Sunpu Park/Sunpu Castle ruins
The castle of the Imagawa and Tokugawa clans, originally built in 1599, was destroyed in 1869.  Today, only the moats remain.  The rest was turned into a park, and is now a popular place for hanami.

In Suruga Ward
Toro
Late Yayoi archaeological site notable as the first archaeological site excavated in Japan in which remains of a 1st-century AD Yayoi-era wet-rice Paddy fields were found.
Kunōzan Tōshō-gū
Shinto shrine that was the original burial place of Shōgun Tokugawa Ieyasu, and the oldest of the Tōshō-gū shrines in Japan. The main festival of the shrine is held annually on 17 April, although its spring festival from 17–18 February is a larger event.
Mariko-juku
Twentieth of the fifty-three stations of the old Tōkaidō road, an old travel route during the Edo period.

In Shimizu Ward
Miho Peninsula
Also known as the scene of the legend of Hagoromo, which is based on the traditional swan maiden motif.

Culture

Festivals
 The Daidogei World Cup is an annual international street performers' festival, held over various locations around the city in November over four days. It was first held in 1992.

 The festival, which begun in 1957 but whose origins date back to traditions hundreds of years old, takes place in April, during the high point of the year for cherry blossoms.  A flower-viewing procession echoes the shōgun Tokugawa Ieyasu's custom of taking daimyōs (feudal lords) to Sengen Shrine to view the cherry blossoms in the 17th century.

 A gigantic fireworks display held upstream on Shizuoka's Abekawa River in late July. It was first held 1953, to remember those who died during World War II and to pray for a national revival.

Cuisine
Oden
a Japanese dish consisting of several ingredients such as boiled eggs, daikon radish, konnyaku, and processed fish cakes stewed in a light, soy-flavoured dashi broth. Oden in Shizuoka uses a dark coloured broth flavoured with beef stock and dark soy sauce.  All ingredients are skewered.  Dried, ground fish (sardine, mackerel, or katsuobushi) and aonori powder (edible seaweed) are sprinkled on top before eating.

Gyoza

Soba noodles

Seafood

Zōni soup
rice cakes in a broth cooked with vegetables, popular at New Year
Tororo
A grated yam soup. Chojiya, a tororo restaurant founded in 1598 in Mariko-juku area of Shizuoka, west of the Abe River, was made famous by Hiroshige when he depicted it in his series of ukiyo-e prints of the 53 stops along the Tōkaidō.

Shizuoka Performing Arts Center 

The Shizuoka Performing Arts Center (SPAC) was founded in 1995 by the Shizuoka Prefecture. The building was designed by architect Arata Isozaki and was opened in 1999 for the second Theatre Olympics.

The arts center is the first publicly funded cultural organization in Japan to have its own troupe of actors and other staff to manage its own venues and facilities for artistic purposes. Suzuki Tadashi was the first Artistic Director, appointed in 1997 and staying in the position until March 2007, after which Miyagi Satoshi took up the appointment. SPAC has organised the World Theatre Festival Shizuoka each year since 2011, as well as creating its own theatre productions (some of which tour abroad), having students to learn at the center, and other theatrical activities.

The World Theatre Festival Shizuoka was formerly called the Shizuoka Spring Festival (2000-2010), being changed to "World Theater Festival Shizuoka under Mt. Fuji" in 2012 by the artistic director of the centre, Miyagi Satoshi. His intention was "to connect Shizuoka to the world through theater", to have performances from every corner of the world, for "people to see that the world isn't a set and finished quantity and there is still plenty of room for change. I wanted to communicate that theater is a window to the world". The festival includes stage plays, puppetry, film, dance and other performance arts.

In 2020, due to the COVID-19 pandemic, it was announced on 3 April that the festival, scheduled to begin from 25 April to 6 May, would be cancelled. Instead, Miyagi staged an online version of the festival.

Sport
With the Shimizu merger, Shimizu S-Pulse became the major football club in the city. Recently, however, a new rival club, Fujieda MYFC (from nearby Fujieda), has been rising in the regional league ranks as a contender for a place in the Japan Football League.
The city hosted the official Asian Basketball Championship for Women in 1995 and 1999.

Notable people 

Princess Akishino – princess in the Japanese Imperial Family
Yoshitaka Amano – illustrator and animator, designed the characters for the early Final Fantasy video game series
Kazuyoshi Hoshino – racecar driver
Daisuke Ichikawa – professional football player
Shohei Ikeda – professional football player
Toru Irie – professional football player
Teruyoshi Ito – professional football player
Yahiro Kazama – professional football player
Naoya Kikuchi – professional football player
Hiroki Kobayashi – professional football player
Tomoaki Kuno – professional football player
Hidetaka Miyazaki – video game director, creator of the Dark Souls series
Fumitake Miura – professional football player
Kazuyoshi Miura – professional football player
Yasutoshi Miura – professional football player
Koki Mizuno – professional football player
Hisashi Mizutori – Olympic gold medal gymnast
Kazuyori Mochizuki – professional football player
Shigeyoshi Mochizuki – professional football player
Riyo Mori – Miss Universe Japan 2007, Miss Universe 2007
Yusuke Mori – professional football player
Ushiomaru Motoyasu – sumo wrestler
Jun Muramatsu – professional football player
Go Oiwa – professional football player
Katsumi Oenoki – professional football player
Takeshi Oki – professional football player
Keisuke Ota – professional football player
Toshihide Saito – professional football player
Momoko Sakura – cartoonist, creator of Chibi Maruko-chan
Yuya Sano – professional football player
Masanori Sekiya – racecar driver
Hideaki Sena – novelist and pharmacologist
Keisuke Serizawa – textile designer
Masatoshi Shima – inventor of the microprocessor
Kotobuki Shiriagari – Manga artist
Tadashi Suzuki – Stage director
Yūichi Suzumoto – novelist
Toranosuke Takagi – racecar driver
Nobuhiro Tanabe – politician
Yoshito Usui – creator of Crayon Shin-chan comics
Takahiro Yamazaki – professional baseball player
Kaito Yamamoto – professional football player
Takahiro Yamanishi – professional football player
Kotaro Yamazaki – professional football player
Takuya Yokoyama – professional football player
Kiyoe Yoshioka – singer, vocalist of Ikimono-gakari

City song

 Written: 13 April 2005
 Lyrics: Citizen competition entry
 Music, additions: Kei Ogura
 Arranged: Shin Kawabe
 Eri Itō sang on the CD release

References

External links

 
 Daidogei World Cup in Shizuoka
 Know Shizuoka – The independent Guide (archived website)
 

 
Port settlements in Japan
Populated coastal places in Japan
Cities designated by government ordinance of Japan